Joanne W. Bowie was a  Republican member of the North Carolina General Assembly representing the state's fifty-seventh House district, including constituents in Guilford county. Between 1989 and 2004, she was a representative for North Carolina State House.

Education
Bowie has a BS and an MS from West Virginia University.  She also studied at the University of Kentucky.

References

External links

|-

|-

Living people
Year of birth missing (living people)
Republican Party members of the North Carolina House of Representatives
West Virginia University alumni
21st-century American politicians